Caleb Henry Trevor (b Much Wenlock, Shropshire, March 17, 1895; d London, June 16, 1976) was an English organist, music editor and teacher.

Life 
C. H. Trevor was the son of Henry John Trevor. He studied at - and graduated from - Oxford University. On 29 April 1930 he married Joan Lucy Fremantle with whom he had a son.

Organist 
Although largely self-taught as an organist C H Trevor was appointed to a series of prestigious organist and teaching posts.  In 1971 the Council of the UK’s Royal College of Organists conferred on Trevor an honorary membership and at the same time awarded him the College’s Fellowship diploma (F.R.C.O.) honoris causa.

Organist posts
 [n.d.][ Organist of St. Michael's-at-the-North-Gate, Oxford.
 [n.d.] Organist to the Honourable Society of Lincolns Inn, London.  
1926–27. Sub-organist at Wells Cathedral.
 1927-37(?). Organist of St. Paul's Cathedral, Kolkata.
1937–64. Organist of St Peter's Eaton Square, London.
 As a recitalist he was noted above all for Baroque music, though a series of broadcasts in 1935 did much to awaken interest in Reger's organ music

Teacher 
 [n.d.] Director of Music at Sherborne School.
1936(?)–64. Professor or Organ at the Royal Academy of Music, London.
 
His Royal Academy of Music pupils have included:

 Kenneth Alwyn
Hazel Davies 
David Gedge
 Sir Nicholas Jackson
 Alistair Jones
 Simon Preston
 Christopher Regan
 Barry Rose
 Anthony Saunders 
Martindale Sidwell

Trevor's 'Oxford Organ Method''' [Oxford University Press, 1971] became an overnight bestseller ... widely used tutor.''

Editor 
His abiding legacy is in the large number of series of graded anthologies of organ music he edited. These contain works of all periods, many of them by composers then largely unknown to British organists.
 
 1957 The Progressive Organist series (pub. Elkin & Co. and later continued by Oxford University Press)
 1960. A second book of wedding pieces (pub. Oxford University Press)
 1060. An Album of memorial and funeral music (pub. Oxford University Press)
 1960. Organ music for Christmas (pub. Oxford University Press)
 1962. Seasonal chorale preludes for manuals only (pub. Oxford University Press)
 1963. Communion by Charles Gounod : for organ (pub. Elkin & Co.)
 1963. Seasonal chorale preludes, with pedals (pub. Oxford University Press)
 1964. A concise school of fugal playing (pub. Oxford University Press)
 1964. A concise school of trio playing for organ (pub. Oxford University Press)
 1966. Old English organ music for manuals (pub. Oxford University Press)
 1971. A Bach organ book for students (pub. Oxford University Press)
 1972. Organ music for manuals (pub. Oxford University Press)
 1972. Two Passion-tide anthems by Charles Gounod (pub. Novello)
 1974. Short chorale preludes : with and without pedals. (pub. Oxford University Press)

References 

1895 births
1976 deaths
Academics of the Royal Academy of Music
English classical organists
People from Much Wenlock
Alumni of the University of Oxford